Steven Dwayne Burtt (born November 5, 1962) is a retired American professional basketball player. The 6'2" point guard played in the National Basketball Association (NBA) sporadically from 1984 until 1993. He also had an established playing career overseas. Born in New York City, Burtt played high school basketball for Charles Evans Hughes before enrolling to Iona to play for the Gaels. Burtt now teaches at Bronx Collegiate Academy (Bronx, New York)

College career
In his 4 season with Iona Burtt played in 121 games averaging 20.9 points per game, 3.5 rebounds per game and 1.7 steals per game. He is the all-time leader of Iona in total points scored for the school with 2,534. He also has several other school records including career field goals made and attempted and season field goals made. Burtt also held the single-season scoring record with 732, a record broken in 2006 by his son Steve Burtt Jr. During his college career he was named three times in the All-MAAC first team (1982–1984) and twice All-MAAC Player of the Year (1983–1984). They are one of just two father-son duos to score 2,000 points each in NCAA Division I basketball, the other being Dell Curry and Steph Curry.

Professional career
Burtt was selected 30th overall in the 1984 NBA draft by the Golden State Warriors. In his rookie season injuries shortened his playing to 47 games,  averaging 4.2 points per game on .383 shooting.

He played professionally in Greece in 1992 before being banned for life from its basketball league for drug violations, consisting of cocaine and hashish found in his luggage returning from a visit to the US. In Italy Burtt changed teams annually in Serie A and, in a timespan of six years, he contested in 155 games averaging 28.4 points, 3.3 rebounds and 2.6 assists per game. In 2007, Burtt was named by Maccabi Rishon LeZion B.C. as the "Best Foreigner Player" of the last 20 years.

Personal
Burtt is the father of former Iona College basketball player Steve Burtt Jr., who shares his name, and played for the senior Ukrainian national team.

References

External links
College & NBA stats @ basketball-reference.com
"Burtt Banned in Greece" @ nytimes.com, published December 1, 1992
"Burtt Has Place to Play" @ nytimes.com, published January 1, 1993
Steve Burtt @ Lega Basket Serie A 

1962 births
Living people
African-American basketball players
Albany Patroons players
American expatriate basketball people in Canada
American expatriate basketball people in Greece
American expatriate basketball people in Israel
American expatriate basketball people in Italy
American expatriate basketball people in the Philippines
American men's basketball players
Andrea Costa Imola players
Basketball players from New York City
Dinamo Sassari players
Golden State Warriors draft picks
Golden State Warriors players
Greek Basket League players
Iona Gaels men's basketball players
Iraklis Thessaloniki B.C. players
Lega Basket Serie A players
Los Angeles Clippers players
Maccabi Rishon LeZion basketball players
Pallacanestro Trieste players
Philippine Basketball Association imports
Phoenix Suns players
Point guards
Reyer Venezia players
Savannah Spirits players
Shell Turbo Chargers players
S.S. Felice Scandone players
Washington Bullets players
21st-century African-American people
20th-century African-American sportspeople